"Butcher of Bosnia" is a sobriquet that may refer to:
 Ratko Mladić (born 1942), Bosnian Serb former general and Chief of Staff of the Army of Republika Srpska
 Radovan Karadžić (born 1945), Bosnian Serb former politician and President of Republika Srpska

Lists of people by nickname